Konstantin Čupković (born 2 January 1987) is a Serbian professional volleyball player, a former member of the Serbia national team. At the professional club level, he plays for BBTS Bielsko-Biała.

Career

Clubs
His first professional club was Serbian Mladi Radnik Pozarevac. In 2011 he moved to Polish Champion, one of the most successful Polish team of PlusLiga, PGE Skra Bełchatów. With PGE Skra Belchatów he won silver medal of Polish Championship in 2011/2012. He has silver medal of Club World Championships from 2012. He won with the club from Bełchatów the Polish Cup in 2012. In 2012 PGE Skra Belchatów, with Konstantin, gained the silver medal of CEV Champions League after the match against Zenit Kazan on Final Four in Łódź, Poland. The match ended controversially, because the judge didn't see an error by a Russian player and ended the match despite the fact that the audience and the players saw the error on screen. He was a player of Sir Safety Perugia in season 2013/2014. On May 4, 2014, he won silver medal of Italian Championship 2013/2014. On May 8, 2014 was announced officially that Čupković moved to the Polish club Transfer Bydgoszcz. In 2015 went to Tours VB. On May 25, 2016, his transfer to Olympiacos was announced officially.

Honours

Clubs
 Men's Club World Championship
  2013 – with PGE Skra Bełchatów 
CEV Champions League
  2011/2012 – with PGE Skra Bełchatów (runner-up)
AVC Asian Champions League
  2021 – with Al Arabi  (runner-up)
National championships
 2006/2007   Serbian Cup with Vojvodina
 2006/2007   Serbian Championship with Vojvodina
 2009/2010   Serbian Championship with Radnički Kragujevac
 2010/2011   Montenegrin Cup with Budvanska Rivijera 
 2010/2011  Montenegrin Championship with Budvanska Rivijera 
 2011/2012  Polish Cup, with PGE Skra Bełchatów
 2012/2013  Polish SuperCup, with PGE Skra Bełchatów
 2015/2016  French SuperCup, with Tours VB
 2016/2017  Greek League Cup, with Olympiacos Piraeus
 2018/2019   Turkish Cup , with Fenerbahçe
 2018/2019  Turkish Championship , with Fenerbahçe
 2020/2021  Croatian Championship , with Mladost
 2021/2022   Croatian Cup , with Mladost
 2021/2022  Croatian Championship , with HAOK Mladost

Individual awards
 2010: Serbian Championship  – Best Scorer
 2010: Serbian Championship  – Best Outside Hitter 
 2015: French Super Cup – Most Valuable Player
 2017: Greek League Cup – Most Valuable Player
 2017: Greek Cup – Most Valuable Player
 2019: French Championship Final – Most Valuable Player
 2021: AVC Asian Champions League – Best Outside Hitter

References

External links

 
 Player profile at LegaVolley.it 
 Player profile at PlusLiga.pl 
 Player profile at Volleybox.net

Living people
1987 births
Serbs of Croatia
Yugoslav Wars refugees
Refugees in Serbia
Sportspeople from Virovitica
Serbian men's volleyball players
European Games competitors for Serbia
Volleyball players at the 2015 European Games
Serbian expatriate sportspeople in Montenegro
Expatriate volleyball players in Montenegro
Serbian expatriate sportspeople in Italy
Expatriate volleyball players in Italy
Serbian expatriate sportspeople in Qatar
Expatriate volleyball players in Qatar
Serbian expatriate sportspeople in Poland
Expatriate volleyball players in Poland
Serbian expatriate sportspeople in France
Expatriate volleyball players in France
Serbian expatriate sportspeople in Greece
Expatriate volleyball players in Greece
Serbian expatriate sportspeople in Turkey
Expatriate volleyball players in Turkey
Serbian expatriate sportspeople in Croatia
Serbian expatriate sportspeople in China
Expatriate volleyball players in China
Skra Bełchatów players
BKS Visła Bydgoszcz players
Tours Volley-Ball players
Olympiacos S.C. players
Fenerbahçe volleyballers
BBTS Bielsko-Biała players
Outside hitters